A thermonuclear weapon, fusion weapon or hydrogen bomb (H bomb) is a second-generation nuclear weapon design. Its greater sophistication affords it vastly greater destructive power than first-generation nuclear bombs, a more compact size, a lower mass, or a combination of these benefits. Characteristics of nuclear fusion reactions make possible the use of non-fissile depleted uranium as the weapon's main fuel, thus allowing more efficient use of scarce fissile material such as uranium-235 or plutonium-239. The first full-scale thermonuclear test was carried out by the United States in 1952; the concept has since been employed by most of the world's nuclear powers in the design of their weapons.

For this reason, thermonuclear weapons are often colloquially called hydrogen bombs or H-bombs.

A fusion explosion begins with the detonation of the fission primary stage. Its temperature soars past approximately 100 million kelvin, causing it to glow intensely with thermal X-rays. These X-rays flood the void (the "radiation channel" often filled with polystyrene foam) between the primary and secondary assemblies placed within an enclosure called a radiation case, which confines the X-ray energy and resists its outward pressure. The distance separating the two assemblies ensures that debris fragments from the fission primary (which move much more slowly than X-ray photons) cannot disassemble the secondary before the fusion explosion runs to completion.

The secondary fusion stage—consisting of outer pusher/tamper, fusion fuel filler and central plutonium spark plug—is imploded by the X-ray energy impinging on its pusher/tamper. This compresses the entire secondary stage and drives up the density of the plutonium spark plug. The density of the plutonium fuel rises to such an extent that the spark plug is driven into a supercritical state, and it begins a nuclear fission chain reaction. The fission products of this chain reaction heat the highly compressed, and thus super dense, thermonuclear fuel surrounding the spark plug to around 300 million kelvin, igniting fusion reactions between fusion fuel nuclei. In modern weapons fueled by lithium deuteride, the fissioning plutonium spark plug also emits free neutrons that collide with lithium nuclei and supply the tritium component of the thermonuclear fuel.

The secondary's relatively massive tamper (which resists outward expansion as the explosion proceeds) also serves as a thermal barrier to keep the fusion fuel filler from becoming too hot, which would spoil the compression. If made of uranium, enriched uranium or plutonium, the tamper captures fast fusion neutrons and undergoes fission itself, increasing the overall explosive yield. Additionally, in most designs the radiation case is also constructed of a fissile material that undergoes fission driven by fast thermonuclear neutrons. Such bombs are classified as two stage weapons, and most current Teller–Ulam designs are such fission-fusion-fission weapons. Fast fission of the tamper and radiation case is the main contribution to the total yield and is the dominant process that produces radioactive fission product fallout.

Before Ivy Mike, Operation Greenhouse of 1951 was the first American nuclear test series to test principles that led to the development of thermonuclear weapons. Sufficient fission was achieved to boost the associated fusion device, and enough was learned to achieve a full-scale device within a year. The design of all modern thermonuclear weapons in the United States is known as the Teller–Ulam configuration for its two chief contributors, Edward Teller and Stanislaw Ulam, who developed it in 1951 for the United States, with certain concepts developed with the contribution of physicist John von Neumann. Similar devices were developed by the Soviet Union, United Kingdom, France, and China. The thermonuclear Tsar Bomba was the most powerful bomb ever tested.

As thermonuclear weapons represent the most efficient design for weapon energy yield in weapons with yields above , virtually all the nuclear weapons of this size deployed by the five nuclear-weapon states under the Non-Proliferation Treaty today are thermonuclear weapons using the Teller–Ulam design.

Public knowledge concerning nuclear weapon design 

Detailed knowledge of fission and fusion weapons is classified to some degree in virtually every industrialized nation. In the United States, such knowledge can by default be classified as "Restricted Data", even if it is created by persons who are not government employees or associated with weapons programs, in a legal doctrine known as "born secret" (though the constitutional standing of the doctrine has been at times called into question; see United States v. Progressive, Inc.). Born secret is rarely invoked for cases of private speculation. The official policy of the United States Department of Energy has been not to acknowledge the leaking of design information, as such acknowledgment would potentially validate the information as accurate. In a small number of prior cases, the U.S. government has attempted to censor weapons information in the public press, with limited success. According to the New York Times, physicist Kenneth W. Ford defied government orders to remove classified information from his book, Building the H Bomb: A Personal History. Ford claims he used only pre-existing information and even submitted a manuscript to the government, which wanted to remove entire sections of the book for concern that foreign nations could use the information.

Though large quantities of vague data have been officially released, and larger quantities of vague data have been unofficially leaked by former bomb designers, most public descriptions of nuclear weapon design details rely to some degree on speculation, reverse engineering from known information, or comparison with similar fields of physics (inertial confinement fusion is the primary example). Such processes have resulted in a body of unclassified knowledge about nuclear bombs that is generally consistent with official unclassified information releases, related physics, and is thought to be internally consistent, though there are some points of interpretation that are still considered open. The state of public knowledge about the Teller–Ulam design has been mostly shaped from a few specific incidents outlined in a section below.

Basic principle 
The basic principle of the Teller–Ulam configuration is the idea that different parts of a thermonuclear weapon can be chained together in "stages", with the detonation of each stage providing the energy to ignite the next stage. At a bare minimum, this implies a primary section that consists of an implosion-type fission bomb (a "trigger"), and a secondary section that consists of fusion fuel. The energy released by the primary compresses the secondary through a process called "radiation implosion", at which point it is heated and undergoes nuclear fusion. This process could be continued, with energy from the secondary igniting a third fusion stage; Russia's AN602 "Tsar Bomba" is thought to have been a three-stage fission-fusion-fusion device. Theoretically by continuing this process thermonuclear weapons with arbitrarily high yield could be constructed. This contrasts with fission weapons, which are limited in yield because only so much fission fuel can be amassed in one place before the danger of its accidentally becoming supercritical becomes too great.

Surrounding the other components is a hohlraum or radiation case, a container that traps the first stage or primary's energy inside temporarily. The outside of this radiation case, which is also normally the outside casing of the bomb, is the only direct visual evidence publicly available of any thermonuclear bomb component's configuration. Numerous photographs of various thermonuclear bomb exteriors have been declassified.

The primary is thought to be a standard implosion method fission bomb, though likely with a core boosted by small amounts of fusion fuel (usually 50/50% deuterium/tritium gas) for extra efficiency; the fusion fuel releases excess neutrons when heated and compressed, inducing additional fission.

The secondary is usually shown as a column of fusion fuel and other components wrapped in many layers. Around the column is first a "pusher-tamper", a heavy layer of uranium-238 or lead that helps compress the fusion fuel (and, in the case of uranium, may eventually undergo fission itself). Inside this is the fusion fuel itself, usually a form of lithium deuteride, which is used because it is easier to weaponize than liquefied tritium/deuterium gas. This dry fuel, when bombarded by neutrons, produces tritium, a heavy isotope of hydrogen that can undergo nuclear fusion, along with the deuterium present in the mixture. (See the article on nuclear fusion for a more detailed technical discussion of fusion reactions.) Inside the layer of fuel is the "spark plug", a hollow column of fissile material ( or ) often boosted by deuterium gas. The spark plug, when compressed, can itself undergo nuclear fission (because of the shape, it is not a critical mass without compression). The tertiary, if one is present, would be set below the secondary and probably be made of the same materials.

Separating the secondary from the primary is the interstage. The fissioning primary produces four types of energy: 1) expanding hot gases from high explosive charges that implode the primary; 2) superheated plasma that was originally the bomb's fissile material and its tamper; 3) the electromagnetic radiation; and 4) the neutrons from the primary's nuclear detonation. The interstage is responsible for accurately modulating the transfer of energy from the primary to the secondary. It must direct the hot gases, plasma, electromagnetic radiation and neutrons toward the right place at the right time. Less than optimal interstage designs have resulted in the secondary failing to work entirely on multiple shots, known as a "fissile fizzle". The Castle Koon shot of Operation Castle is a good example; a small flaw allowed the neutron flux from the primary to prematurely begin heating the secondary, weakening the compression enough to prevent any fusion.

There is very little detailed information in the open literature about the mechanism of the interstage. One of the best sources is a simplified diagram of a British thermonuclear weapon similar to the American W80 warhead. It was released by Greenpeace in a report titled "Dual Use Nuclear Technology". The major components and their arrangement are in the diagram, though details are almost absent; what scattered details it does include likely have intentional omissions or inaccuracies. They are labeled "End-cap and Neutron Focus Lens" and "Reflector Wrap"; the former channels neutrons to the / Spark Plug while the latter refers to an X-ray reflector; typically a cylinder made of an X-ray opaque material such as uranium with the primary and secondary at either end. It does not reflect like a mirror; instead, it gets heated to a high temperature by the X-ray flux from the primary, then it emits more evenly spread X-rays that travel to the secondary, causing what is known as radiation implosion. In Ivy Mike, gold was used as a coating over the uranium to enhance the blackbody effect. Next comes the "Reflector/Neutron Gun Carriage". The reflector seals the gap between the Neutron Focus Lens (in the center) and the outer casing near the primary. It separates the primary from the secondary and performs the same function as the previous reflector. There are about six neutron guns (seen here from Sandia National Laboratories) each protruding through the outer edge of the reflector with one end in each section; all are clamped to the carriage and arranged more or less evenly around the casing's circumference. The neutron guns are tilted so the neutron emitting end of each gun end is pointed towards the central axis of the bomb. Neutrons from each neutron gun pass through and are focused by the neutron focus lens towards the centre of primary in order to boost the initial fissioning of the plutonium. A "polystyrene Polarizer/Plasma Source" is also shown (see below).

The first U.S. government document to mention the interstage was only recently released to the public promoting the 2004 initiation of the Reliable Replacement Warhead Program. A graphic includes blurbs describing the potential advantage of a RRW on a part by part level, with the interstage blurb saying a new design would replace "toxic, brittle material" and "expensive 'special' material... [that require] unique facilities". The "toxic, brittle material" is widely assumed to be beryllium, which fits that description and would also moderate the neutron flux from the primary. Some material to absorb and re-radiate the X-rays in a particular manner may also be used.

Candidates for the "special material" are polystyrene and a substance called "Fogbank", an unclassified codename. Fogbank's composition is classified, though aerogel has been suggested as a possibility. It was first used in thermonuclear weapons with the W76 thermonuclear warhead, and produced at a plant in the Y-12 Complex at Oak Ridge, Tennessee, for use in the W76.  Production of Fogbank lapsed after the W76 production run ended.  The W76 Life Extension Program required more Fogbank to be made.  This was complicated by the fact that the original Fogbank's properties were not fully documented, so a massive effort was mounted to re-invent the process. An impurity crucial to the properties of the old Fogbank was omitted during the new process. Only close analysis of new and old batches revealed the nature of that impurity. The manufacturing process used acetonitrile as a solvent, which led to at least three evacuations of the Fogbank plant in 2006. Widely used in the petroleum and pharmaceutical industries, acetonitrile is flammable and toxic. Y-12 is the sole producer of Fogbank.

Summary 

A simplified summary of the above explanation is:

 A (relatively) small fission bomb known as the "primary" explodes.
 Energy released in the primary is transferred to the secondary (or fusion) stage. This energy compresses the fusion fuel and sparkplug; the compressed sparkplug becomes supercritical and undergoes a fission chain reaction, further heating the compressed fusion fuel to a high enough temperature to induce fusion.
 Energy released by the fusion events continues heating the fuel, keeping the reaction going.
 The fusion fuel of the secondary stage may be surrounded by a layer of additional fuel that undergoes fission when hit by the neutrons from the reactions within. These fission events account for about half of the total energy released in typical designs.

Compression of the secondary 

The basic idea of the Teller–Ulam configuration is that each "stage" would undergo fission or fusion (or both) and release energy, much of which would be transferred to another stage to trigger it. How exactly the energy is "transported" from the primary to the secondary has been the subject of some disagreement in the open press, but is thought to be transmitted through the X-rays and Gamma rays that are emitted from the fissioning primary. This energy is then used to compress the secondary. The crucial detail of how the X-rays create the pressure is the main remaining disputed point in the unclassified press. There are three proposed theories:
 Radiation pressure exerted by the X-rays. This was the first idea put forth by Howard Morland in the article in The Progressive.
 X-rays creating a plasma in the radiation channel's filler (a polystyrene or "Fogbank" plastic foam). This was a second idea put forward by Chuck Hansen and later by Howard Morland.
 Tamper/Pusher ablation. This is the concept best supported by physical analysis.

Radiation pressure 
The radiation pressure exerted by the large quantity of X-ray photons inside the closed casing might be enough to compress the secondary. Electromagnetic radiation such as X-rays or light carries momentum and exerts a force on any surface it strikes. The pressure of radiation at the intensities seen in everyday life, such as sunlight striking a surface, is usually imperceptible, but at the extreme intensities found in a thermonuclear bomb the pressure is enormous.

Foam plasma pressure 

Foam plasma pressure is the concept that Chuck Hansen introduced during the Progressive case, based on research that located declassified documents listing special foams as liner components within the radiation case of thermonuclear weapons.

The sequence of firing the weapon (with the foam) would be as follows:
 The high explosives surrounding the core of the primary fire, compressing the fissile material into a supercritical state and beginning the fission chain reaction.
 The fissioning primary emits thermal X-rays, which "reflect" along the inside of the casing, irradiating the polystyrene foam.
 The irradiated foam becomes a hot plasma, pushing against the tamper of the secondary, compressing it tightly, and beginning the fission chain reaction in the spark plug.
 Pushed from both sides (from the primary and the spark plug), the lithium deuteride fuel is highly compressed and heated to thermonuclear temperatures. Also, by being bombarded with neutrons, each lithium-6 (6Li) atom splits into one tritium atom and one alpha particle. Then begins a fusion reaction between the tritium and the deuterium, releasing even more neutrons, and a huge amount of energy.
 The fuel undergoing the fusion reaction emits a large flux of high energy neutrons, which irradiates the  tamper (or the  bomb casing), causing it to undergo a fast fission reaction, providing about half of the total energy.
This would complete the fission-fusion-fission sequence. Fusion, unlike fission, is relatively "clean"—it releases energy but no harmful radioactive products or large amounts of nuclear fallout. The fission reactions though, especially the last fission reactions, release a tremendous amount of fission products and fallout. If the last fission stage is omitted, by replacing the uranium tamper with one made of lead, for example, the overall explosive force is reduced by approximately half but the amount of fallout is relatively low. The neutron bomb is a hydrogen bomb with an intentionally thin tamper, allowing as many of the fast fusion neutrons as possible to escape.

Current technical criticisms of the idea of "foam plasma pressure" focus on unclassified analysis from similar high energy physics fields that indicate that the pressure produced by such a plasma would only be a small multiplier of the basic photon pressure within the radiation case, and also that the known foam materials intrinsically have a very low absorption efficiency of the gamma ray and X-ray radiation from the primary. Most of the energy produced would be absorbed by either the walls of the radiation case or the tamper around the secondary. Analyzing the effects of that absorbed energy led to the third mechanism: ablation.

Tamper-pusher ablation 
The outer casing of the secondary assembly is called the "tamper-pusher". The purpose of a tamper in an implosion bomb is to delay the expansion of the reacting fuel supply (which is very hot dense plasma) until the fuel is fully consumed and the explosion runs to completion. The same tamper material serves also as a pusher in that it is the medium by which the outside pressure (force acting on the surface area of the secondary) is transferred to the mass of fusion fuel.

The proposed tamper-pusher ablation mechanism posits that the outer layers of the thermonuclear secondary's tamper-pusher are heated so extremely by the primary's X-ray flux that they expand violently and ablate away (fly off). Because total momentum is conserved, this mass of high velocity ejecta impels the rest of the tamper-pusher to recoil inwards with tremendous force, crushing the fusion fuel and the spark plug. The tamper-pusher is built robustly enough to insulate the fusion fuel from the extreme heat outside; otherwise the compression would be spoiled.

Rough calculations for the basic ablation effect are relatively simple: the energy from the primary is distributed evenly onto all of the surfaces within the outer radiation case, with the components coming to a thermal equilibrium, and the effects of that thermal energy are then analyzed. The energy is mostly deposited within about one X-ray optical thickness of the tamper/pusher outer surface, and the temperature of that layer can then be calculated. The velocity at which the surface then expands outwards is calculated and, from a basic Newtonian momentum balance, the velocity at which the rest of the tamper implodes inwards.

Comparing implosion mechanisms 
Comparing the three mechanisms proposed, it can be seen that:

The calculated ablation pressure is one order of magnitude greater than the higher proposed plasma pressures and nearly two orders of magnitude greater than calculated radiation pressure. No mechanism to avoid the absorption of energy into the radiation case wall and the secondary tamper has been suggested, making ablation apparently unavoidable. The other mechanisms appear to be unneeded.

United States Department of Defense official declassification reports indicate that foamed plastic materials are or may be used in radiation case liners, and despite the low direct plasma pressure they may be of use in delaying the ablation until energy has distributed evenly and a sufficient fraction has reached the secondary's tamper/pusher.

Richard Rhodes' book Dark Sun stated that a  layer of plastic foam was fixed to the lead liner of the inside of the Ivy Mike steel casing using copper nails. Rhodes quotes several designers of that bomb explaining that the plastic foam layer inside the outer case is to delay ablation and thus recoil of the outer case: if the foam were not there, metal would ablate from the inside of the outer case with a large impulse, causing the casing to recoil outwards rapidly. The purpose of the casing is to contain the explosion for as long as possible, allowing as much X-ray ablation of the metallic surface of the secondary stage as possible, so it compresses the secondary efficiently, maximizing the fusion yield. Plastic foam has a low density, so causes a smaller impulse when it ablates than metal does.

Design variations 
A number of possible variations to the weapon design have been proposed:
This is because  nuclei also undergo fission by slow neutrons ( nuclei require a minimum energy of about ), and because these slower neutrons are produced by other fissioning  nuclei in the jacket (in other words,  supports the nuclear chain reaction whereas  does not). Furthermore, a  jacket fosters neutron multiplication, whereas  nuclei consume fusion neutrons in the fast-fission process. Using a final fissionable/fissile jacket of  would thus increase the yield of a Teller–Ulam bomb above a depleted uranium or natural uranium jacket. This has been proposed specifically for the W87 warheads retrofitted to currently deployed LGM-30 Minuteman III ICBMs.
 In some descriptions, additional internal structures exist to protect the secondary from receiving excessive neutrons from the primary.
 The inside of the casing may or may not be specially machined to "reflect" the X-rays. X-ray "reflection" is not like light reflecting off of a mirror, but rather the reflector material is heated by the X-rays, causing the material itself to emit X-rays, which then travel to the secondary.

Two special variations exist that will be discussed in a subsequent section: the cryogenically cooled liquid deuterium device used for the Ivy Mike test, and the putative design of the W88 nuclear warhead—a small, MIRVed version of the Teller–Ulam configuration with a prolate (egg or watermelon shaped) primary and an elliptical secondary.

Most bombs do not apparently have tertiary "stages"—that is, third compression stage(s), which are additional fusion stages compressed by a previous fusion stage. (The fissioning of the last blanket of uranium, which provides about half the yield in large bombs, does not count as a "stage" in this terminology.)

The U.S. tested three-stage bombs in several explosions (see Operation Redwing) but is thought to have fielded only one such tertiary model, i.e., a bomb in which a fission stage, followed by a fusion stage, finally compresses yet another fusion stage. This U.S. design was the heavy but highly efficient (i.e., nuclear weapon yield per unit bomb weight)  B41 nuclear bomb. The Soviet Union is thought to have used multiple stages (including more than one tertiary fusion stage) in their  ( in intended use) Tsar Bomba (as with other bombs, however, the fissionable jacket could be replaced with lead in such a bomb, and in this one, for demonstration, it was). If any hydrogen bombs have been made from configurations other than those based on the Teller–Ulam design, the fact of it is not publicly known. (A possible exception to this is the Soviet early Sloika design.)

In essence, the Teller–Ulam configuration relies on at least two instances of implosion occurring: first, the conventional (chemical) explosives in the primary would compress the fissile core, resulting in a fission explosion many times more powerful than that which chemical explosives could achieve alone (first stage). Second, the radiation from the fissioning of the primary would be used to compress and ignite the secondary fusion stage, resulting in a fusion explosion many times more powerful than the fission explosion alone. This chain of compression could conceivably be continued with an arbitrary number of tertiary fusion stages, each igniting more fusion fuel in the next stage although this is debated (see more: Arbitrarily large yield debate). Finally, efficient bombs (but not so-called neutron bombs) end with the fissioning of the final natural uranium tamper, something that could not normally be achieved without the neutron flux provided by the fusion reactions in secondary or tertiary stages. Such designs are suggested to be capable of being scaled up to an arbitrary large yield (with apparently as many fusion stages as desired), potentially to the level of a "doomsday device." However, usually such weapons were not more than a dozen megatons, which was generally considered enough to destroy even the most hardened practical targets (for example, a control facility such as the Cheyenne Mountain Complex). Even such large bombs have been replaced by smaller-yield bunker buster type nuclear bombs (see more: nuclear bunker buster).

As discussed above, for destruction of cities and non-hardened targets, breaking the mass of a single missile payload down into smaller MIRV bombs, in order to spread the energy of the explosions into a "pancake" area, is far more efficient in terms of area-destruction per unit of bomb energy.

History

United States 

The idea of a thermonuclear fusion bomb ignited by a smaller fission bomb was first proposed by Enrico Fermi to his colleague Edward Teller when they were talking at Columbia University in September 1941, at the start of what would become the Manhattan Project. Teller spent much of the Manhattan Project attempting to figure out how to make the design work, preferring it to work on the atomic bomb, and over the last year of the project was assigned exclusively to the task. However once World War II ended, there was little impetus to devote many resources to the Super, as it was then known.

The first atomic bomb test by the Soviet Union in August 1949 came earlier than expected by Americans, and over the next several months there was an intense debate within the U.S. government, military, and scientific communities regarding whether to proceed with development of the far more powerful Super. The debate covered matters that were alternatively strategic, pragmatic, and moral. In their Report of the General Advisory Committee, Robert Oppenheimer and colleagues concluded that "[t]he extreme danger to mankind inherent in the proposal [to develop thermonuclear weapons] wholly outweighs any military advantage." Despite the objections raised, on 31 January 1950, President Harry S. Truman made the decision to go forward with the development of the new weapon.

But deciding to do it did not make it a reality, and Teller and other U.S. physicists struggled to find a workable design. Stanislaw Ulam, a co-worker of Teller, made the first key conceptual leaps towards a workable fusion design. Ulam's two innovations that rendered the fusion bomb practical were that compression of the thermonuclear fuel before extreme heating was a practical path towards the conditions needed for fusion, and the idea of staging or placing a separate thermonuclear component outside a fission primary component, and somehow using the primary to compress the secondary. Teller then realized that the gamma and X-ray radiation produced in the primary could transfer enough energy into the secondary to create a successful implosion and fusion burn, if the whole assembly was wrapped in a hohlraum or radiation case. Teller and his various proponents and detractors later disputed the degree to which Ulam had contributed to the theories underlying this mechanism. Indeed, shortly before his death, and in a last-ditch effort to discredit Ulam's contributions, Teller claimed that one of his own "graduate students" had proposed the mechanism.

The "George" shot of Operation Greenhouse of 9 May 1951 tested the basic concept for the first time on a very small scale. As the first successful (uncontrolled) release of nuclear fusion energy, which made up a small fraction of the  total yield, it raised expectations to a near certainty that the concept would work.

The liquid deuterium fuel of Ivy Mike was impractical for a deployable weapon, and the next advance was to use a solid lithium deuteride fusion fuel instead. In 1954 this was tested in the "Castle Bravo" shot (the device was code-named Shrimp), which had a yield of  (2.5 times expected) and is the largest U.S. bomb ever tested.

Efforts in the United States soon shifted towards developing miniaturized Teller–Ulam weapons that could fit into intercontinental ballistic missiles and submarine-launched ballistic missiles. Further innovation in miniaturizing warheads was accomplished by the mid-1970s, when versions of the Teller–Ulam design were created that could fit ten or more warheads on the end of a small MIRVed missile (see the section on the W88 below).

Soviet Union 

The first Soviet fusion design, developed by Andrei Sakharov and Vitaly Ginzburg in 1949 (before the Soviets had a working fission bomb), was dubbed the Sloika, after a Russian layer cake, and was not of the Teller–Ulam configuration. It used alternating layers of fissile material and lithium deuteride fusion fuel spiked with tritium (this was later dubbed Sakharov's "First Idea"). Though nuclear fusion might have been technically achievable, it did not have the scaling property of a "staged" weapon. Thus, such a design could not produce thermonuclear weapons whose explosive yields could be made arbitrarily large (unlike U.S. designs at that time). The fusion layer wrapped around the fission core could only moderately multiply the fission energy (modern Teller–Ulam designs can multiply it 30-fold). Additionally, the whole fusion stage had to be imploded by conventional explosives, along with the fission core, substantially multiplying the amount of chemical explosives needed.

Attempts to use a Sloika design to achieve megaton-range results proved unfeasible. After the United States tested the "Ivy Mike" thermonuclear device in November 1952, proving that a multimegaton bomb could be created, the Soviets searched for an alternative design. The "Second Idea", as Sakharov referred to it in his memoirs, was a previous proposal by Ginzburg in November 1948 to use lithium deuteride in the bomb, which would, in the course of being bombarded by neutrons, produce tritium and free deuterium. In late 1953 physicist Viktor Davidenko achieved the first breakthrough, that of keeping the primary and secondary parts of the bombs in separate pieces ("staging"). The next breakthrough was discovered and developed by Sakharov and Yakov Zel'dovich, that of using the X-rays from the fission bomb to compress the secondary before fusion ("radiation implosion"), in early 1954.

The Soviets demonstrated the power of the "staging" concept in October 1961, when they detonated the massive and unwieldy Tsar Bomba, a  hydrogen bomb that derived almost  of its energy from fusion. It was the largest nuclear weapon developed and tested by any country.

United Kingdom 

In 1954 work began at Aldermaston to develop the British fusion bomb, with Sir William Penney in charge of the project. British knowledge on how to make a thermonuclear fusion bomb was rudimentary, and at the time the United States was not exchanging any nuclear knowledge because of the Atomic Energy Act of 1946. However, the British were allowed to observe the U.S. Castle tests and used sampling aircraft in the mushroom clouds, providing them with clear, direct evidence of the compression produced in the secondary stages by radiation implosion.

Because of these difficulties, in 1955 British prime minister Anthony Eden agreed to a secret plan, whereby if the Aldermaston scientists failed or were greatly delayed in developing the fusion bomb, it would be replaced by an extremely large fission bomb.

In 1957 the Operation Grapple tests were carried out. The second test Orange Herald was the modified fission bomb and produced —making it the largest fission explosion ever. At the time almost everyone (including the pilots of the plane that dropped it) thought that this was a fusion bomb. This bomb was put into service in 1958.

A second set of tests was scheduled, with testing recommencing in September 1957. The first test was based on a "… new simpler design. A two stage thermonuclear bomb that had a much more powerful trigger". On 28 April 1958 a bomb was dropped that yielded —Britain's most powerful test. Two final air burst tests on 2 and 11 September 1958, dropped smaller bombs that yielded around  each.

American observers had been invited to these kinds of tests. After Britain's successful detonation of a megaton-range device (and thus demonstrating a practical understanding of the Teller–Ulam design "secret"), the United States agreed to exchange some of its nuclear designs with the United Kingdom, leading to the 1958 US–UK Mutual Defence Agreement. Instead of continuing with its own design, the British were given access to the design of the smaller American Mk 28 warhead and were able to manufacture copies.

The United Kingdom had worked closely with the Americans on the Manhattan Project. British access to nuclear weapons information was cut off by the United States at one point due to concerns about Soviet espionage. Full cooperation was not reestablished until an agreement governing the handling of secret information and other issues was signed.

China 

Mao Zedong decided to begin a Chinese nuclear-weapons program during the First Taiwan Strait Crisis of 1954–1955. The People's Republic of China detonated its first hydrogen (thermonuclear) bomb on 17 June 1967, 32 months after detonating its first fission weapon, with a yield of 3.31 Mt. It took place in the Lop Nor Test Site, in northwest China. China had received extensive technical help from the Soviet Union to jump-start their nuclear program, but by 1960, the rift between the Soviet Union and China had become so great that the Soviet Union ceased all assistance to China.

A story in The New York Times by William Broad reported that in 1995, a supposed Chinese double agent delivered information indicating that China knew secret details of the U.S. W88 warhead, supposedly through espionage. (This line of investigation eventually resulted in the abortive trial of Wen Ho Lee.)

France 

The French nuclear testing site was moved to the unpopulated French atolls in the Pacific Ocean. The first test conducted at these new sites was the "Canopus" test in the Fangataufa atoll in French Polynesia on 24 August 1968, the country's first multistage thermonuclear weapon test. The result of this test was significant atmospheric contamination. Very little is known about France's development of the Teller–Ulam design, beyond the fact that France detonated a  device in the "Canopus" test. France reportedly had great difficulty with its initial development of the Teller-Ulam design, but it later overcame these, and is believed to have nuclear weapons equal in sophistication to the other major nuclear powers.

France and China did not sign or ratify the Partial Nuclear Test Ban Treaty of 1963, which banned nuclear test explosions in the atmosphere, underwater, or in outer space. Between 1966 and 1996 France carried out more than 190 nuclear tests. France's final nuclear test took place on 27 January 1996, and then the country dismantled its Polynesian test sites. France signed the Comprehensive Nuclear-Test-Ban Treaty that same year, and then ratified the Treaty within two years.

France confirmed that its nuclear arsenal contains about 300 warheads, carried by submarine-launched ballistic missiles (SLBMs) and fighter-bombers in 2015. France has four Triomphant-class ballistic missile submarines. One ballistic missile submarine is deployed in the deep ocean, but a total of three must be in operational use at all times. The three older submarines are armed with 16 M45 missiles. The newest submarine, "Le Terrible", was commissioned in 2010, and it has M51 missiles capable of carrying TN 75 thermonuclear warheads. The air fleet is four squadrons at four different bases. In total, there are 23 Mirage 2000N aircraft and 20 Rafales capable of carrying nuclear warheads. The M51.1 missiles are intended to be replaced with the new M51.2 warhead beginning in 2016, which has a  greater range than the M51.1.

France also has about 60 air-launched missiles tipped with TN 80/TN 81 warheads with a yield of about  each. France's nuclear program has been carefully designed to ensure that these weapons remain usable decades into the future.

India 

On 11 May 1998, India announced that it had detonated a thermonuclear bomb in its Operation Shakti tests ("Shakti-I", specifically, in Hindi the word 'Shakti' means power). Dr. Samar Mubarakmand, a Pakistani nuclear physicist, asserted that if Shakti-I had been a thermonuclear test, the device had failed to fire. However, Dr. Harold M. Agnew, former director of the Los Alamos National Laboratory, said that India's assertion of having detonated a staged thermonuclear bomb was believable. Another cited reason was that radioactivity released from yields significantly more than 45 Kilotons might not have been contained fully. After the Pokhran-II tests, Dr. Rajagopal Chidambaram, former chairman of the Atomic Energy Commission of India said that India has the capability to build thermonuclear bombs of any yield at will.

The yield of India's hydrogen bomb test remains highly debatable among the Indian science community and the international scholars. The question of politicisation and disputes between Indian scientists further complicated the matter.

In an interview in August 2009, the director for the 1998 test site preparations, Dr. K. Santhanam claimed that the yield of the thermonuclear explosion was lower than expected and that India should therefore not rush into signing the CTBT. Other Indian scientists involved in the test have disputed Dr. K. Santhanam's claim, arguing that Santhanam's claims are unscientific. U.S. seismologist Jack Evernden has argued that for correct estimation of yields, one should ‘account properly for geological and seismological differences between test sites’.

Israel 

Israel is alleged to possess thermonuclear weapons of the Teller–Ulam design, but it is not known to have tested any nuclear devices, although it is widely speculated that the Vela incident of 1979 may have been a joint Israeli–South African nuclear test.

It is well established that Edward Teller advised and guided the Israeli establishment on general nuclear matters for some twenty years. Between 1964 and 1967, Teller made six visits to Israel where he lectured at the Tel Aviv University on general topics in theoretical physics. It took him a year to convince the CIA about Israel's capability and finally in 1976, Carl Duckett of the CIA testified to the U.S. Congress, after receiving credible information from an "American scientist" (Teller), on Israel's nuclear capability. During the 1990s, Teller eventually confirmed speculations in the media that it was during his visits in the 1960s that he concluded that Israel was in possession of nuclear weapons. After he conveyed the matter to the higher level of the U.S. government, Teller reportedly said: "They [Israel] have it, and they were clever enough to trust their research and not to test, they know that to test would get them into trouble."

Pakistan 

According to the scientific data received and published by PAEC, the Corps of Engineers, and Kahuta Research Laboratories (KRL), in May 1998, Pakistan carried out six underground nuclear tests in Chagai Hills and Kharan Desert in Balochistan Province (see the code-names of the tests, Chagai-I and Chagai-II). None of these boosted fission devices was the thermonuclear weapon design, according to KRL and PAEC.

North Korea 

North Korea claimed to have tested its miniaturised thermonuclear bomb on 6 January 2016. North Korea's first three nuclear tests (2006, 2009 and 2013) were relatively low yield and do not appear to have been of a thermonuclear weapon design. In 2013, the South Korean Defense Ministry speculated that North Korea may be trying to develop a "hydrogen bomb" and such a device may be North Korea's next weapons test. In January 2016, North Korea claimed to have successfully tested a hydrogen bomb, although only a magnitude 5.1 seismic event was detected at the time of the test, a similar magnitude to the 2013 test of a  atomic bomb. These seismic recordings cast doubt upon North Korea's claim that a hydrogen bomb was tested and suggest it was a non-fusion nuclear test.

On 3 September 2017, the country's state media reported that a hydrogen bomb test was conducted that resulted in "perfect success". According to the U.S. Geological Survey (USGS), the blast resulted in an earthquake with a magnitude of 6.3, 10 times more powerful than previous nuclear tests conducted by North Korea.

On 12 September, NORSAR revised its estimate of the earthquake magnitude upward to 6.1, matching that of the CTBTO, but less powerful than the USGS estimate of 6.3.

On 13 September, an analysis of before and after synthetic-aperture radar satellite imagery of the test site was published suggesting the test occurred under  of rock and the yield "could have been in excess of 300 kilotons".

Public knowledge 
The Teller–Ulam design was for many years considered one of the top nuclear secrets, and even today it is not discussed in any detail by official publications with origins "behind the fence" of classification. United States Department of Energy (DOE) policy has been, and continues to be, that they do not acknowledge when "leaks" occur, because doing so would acknowledge the accuracy of the supposed leaked information. Aside from images of the warhead casing, most information in the public domain about this design is relegated to a few terse statements by the DOE and the work of a few individual investigators.

DOE statements 
In 1972 the United States government declassified a document stating "[I]n thermonuclear (TN) weapons, a fission 'primary' is used to trigger a TN reaction in thermonuclear fuel referred to as a 'secondary'", and in 1979 added, "[I]n thermonuclear weapons, radiation from a fission explosive can be contained and used to transfer energy to compress and ignite a physically separate component containing thermonuclear fuel." To this latter sentence the US government specified that "Any elaboration of this statement will be classified." The only information that may pertain to the spark plug was declassified in 1991: "Fact that fissile or fissionable materials are present in some secondaries, material unidentified, location unspecified, use unspecified, and weapons undesignated." In 1998 the DOE declassified the statement that "The fact that materials may be present in channels and the term 'channel filler,' with no elaboration", which may refer to the polystyrene foam (or an analogous substance).

Whether these statements vindicate some or all of the models presented above is up for interpretation, and official U.S. government releases about the technical details of nuclear weapons have been purposely equivocating in the past (see, e.g., Smyth Report). Other information, such as the types of fuel used in some of the early weapons, has been declassified, though precise technical information has not been.

The Progressive case 

Most of the current ideas on the workings of the Teller–Ulam design came into public awareness after the Department of Energy (DOE) attempted to censor a magazine article by U.S. antiweapons activist Howard Morland in 1979 on the "secret of the hydrogen bomb". In 1978, Morland had decided that discovering and exposing this "last remaining secret" would focus attention onto the arms race and allow citizens to feel empowered to question official statements on the importance of nuclear weapons and nuclear secrecy. Most of Morland's ideas about how the weapon worked were compiled from highly accessible sources—the drawings that most inspired his approach came from none other than the Encyclopedia Americana. Morland also interviewed (often informally) many former Los Alamos scientists (including Teller and Ulam, though neither gave him any useful information), and used a variety of interpersonal strategies to encourage informative responses from them (i.e., asking questions such as "Do they still use spark plugs?" even if he was not aware what the latter term specifically referred to).

Morland eventually concluded that the "secret" was that the primary and secondary were kept separate and that radiation pressure from the primary compressed the secondary before igniting it. When an early draft of the article, to be published in The Progressive magazine, was sent to the DOE after falling into the hands of a professor who was opposed to Morland's goal, the DOE requested that the article not be published, and pressed for a temporary injunction. The DOE argued that Morland's information was (1) likely derived from classified sources, (2) if not derived from classified sources, itself counted as "secret" information under the "born secret" clause of the 1954 Atomic Energy Act, and (3) was dangerous and would encourage nuclear proliferation.

Morland and his lawyers disagreed on all points, but the injunction was granted, as the judge in the case felt that it was safer to grant the injunction and allow Morland, et al., to appeal, which they did in United States v. The Progressive (1979).

Through a variety of more complicated circumstances, the DOE case began to wane as it became clear that some of the data they were attempting to claim as "secret" had been published in a students' encyclopedia a few years earlier. After another H-bomb speculator, Chuck Hansen, had his own ideas about the "secret" (quite different from Morland's) published in a Wisconsin newspaper, the DOE claimed that The Progressive case was moot, dropped its suit, and allowed the magazine to publish its article, which it did in November 1979. Morland had by then, however, changed his opinion of how the bomb worked, suggesting that a foam medium (the polystyrene) rather than radiation pressure was used to compress the secondary, and that in the secondary there was a spark plug of fissile material as well. He published these changes, based in part on the proceedings of the appeals trial, as a short erratum in The Progressive a month later. In 1981, Morland published a book about his experience, describing in detail the train of thought that led him to his conclusions about the "secret".

Morland's work is interpreted as being at least partially correct because the DOE had sought to censor it, one of the few times they violated their usual approach of not acknowledging "secret" material that had been released; however, to what degree it lacks information, or has incorrect information, is not known with any confidence. The difficulty that a number of nations had in developing the Teller–Ulam design (even when they apparently understood the design, such as with the United Kingdom), makes it somewhat unlikely that this simple information alone is what provides the ability to manufacture thermonuclear weapons. Nevertheless, the ideas put forward by Morland in 1979 have been the basis for all the current speculation on the Teller–Ulam design.

Nuclear reduction 
In January 1986, Soviet leader Mikhail Gorbachev publicly proposed a three-stage program for abolishing the world's nuclear weapons by the end of the 20th century. Two years before his death in 1989, Andrei Sakharov's comments at a scientists’ forum helped begin the process for the elimination of thousands of nuclear ballistic missiles from the US and Soviet arsenals. Sakharov (1921–89) was recruited into the Soviet Union's nuclear weapons program in 1948, a year after he completed his doctorate. In 1949 the US detected the first Soviet test of a fission bomb, and the two countries embarked on a desperate race to design a thermonuclear hydrogen bomb that was a thousand times more powerful. Like his US counterparts, Sakharov justified his H-bomb work by pointing to the danger of the other country's achieving a monopoly. But also like some of the US scientists who had worked on the Manhattan Project, he felt a responsibility to inform his nation's leadership and then the world about the dangers from nuclear weapons. Sakharov's first attempt to influence policy was brought about by his concern about possible genetic damage from long-lived radioactive carbon-14 created in the atmosphere from nitrogen-14 by the enormous fluxes of neutrons released in H-bomb tests. In 1968, a friend suggested that Sakharov write an essay about the role of the intelligentsia in world affairs. Self-publishing was the method at the time for spreading unapproved manuscripts in the Soviet Union. Many readers would create multiple copies by typing with multiple sheets of paper interleaved with carbon paper. One copy of Sakharov's essay, "Reflections on Progress, Peaceful Coexistence, and Intellectual Freedom", was smuggled out of the Soviet Union and published by the New York Times. More than 18 million reprints were produced during 1968–69. After the essay was published, Sakharov was barred from returning to work in the nuclear weapons program and took a research position in Moscow. In 1980, after an interview with the New York Times in which he denounced the Soviet invasion of Afghanistan, the government put him beyond the reach of Western media by exiling him and his wife to Gorky. In March 1985, Gorbachev became general secretary of the Soviet Communist Party. More than a year and a half later, he persuaded the Politburo, the party's executive committee, to allow Sakharov and Bonner to return to Moscow. Sakharov was elected as an opposition member to the Soviet Congress of People's Deputies in 1989. Later that year he had a cardiac arrhythmia and died in his apartment. He left behind a draft of a new Soviet constitution that emphasized democracy and human rights.

Notable accidents 

On 5 February 1958, during a training mission flown by a B-47, a Mark 15 nuclear bomb, also known as the Tybee Bomb, was lost off the coast of Tybee Island near Savannah, Georgia. The bomb was thought by the Department of Energy to lie buried under several feet of silt at the bottom of Wassaw Sound.

On 17 January 1966, a fatal collision occurred between a B-52G and a KC-135 Stratotanker over Palomares, Spain. The conventional explosives in two of the Mk28-type hydrogen bombs detonated upon impact with the ground, dispersing plutonium over nearby farms. A third bomb landed intact near Palomares while the fourth fell 12 miles (19 km) off the coast into the Mediterranean sea.

On 21 January 1968, a B-52G, with four B28FI thermonuclear bombs aboard as part of Operation Chrome Dome, crashed on the ice of the North Star Bay while attempting an emergency landing at Thule Air Base in Greenland. The resulting fire caused extensive radioactive contamination. Personnel involved in the cleanup failed to recover all the debris from three of the bombs, and one bomb was not recovered.

Variations

Ivy Mike 
In his 1995 book Dark Sun: The Making of the Hydrogen Bomb, author Richard Rhodes describes in detail the internal components of the "Ivy Mike" Sausage device, based on information obtained from extensive interviews with the scientists and engineers who assembled it. According to Rhodes, the actual mechanism for the compression of the secondary was a combination of the radiation pressure, foam plasma pressure, and tamper-pusher ablation theories described above; the radiation from the primary heated the polyethylene foam lining of the casing to a plasma, which then re-radiated radiation into the secondary's pusher, causing its surface to ablate and driving it inwards, compressing the secondary, igniting the sparkplug, and causing the fusion reaction.  The general applicability of this principle is unclear.

W88 
In 1999 a reporter for the San Jose Mercury News reported that the U.S. W88 nuclear warhead, a small MIRVed warhead used on the Trident II SLBM, had a prolate (egg or watermelon shaped) primary (code-named Komodo) and a spherical secondary (code-named Cursa) inside a specially shaped radiation case (known as the "peanut" for its shape). The smaller warhead allows more of them to fit onto a single missile and improves basic flight properties such as speed and range.

See also 
 COLEX process (isotopic separation)
 History of the Teller–Ulam design
 NUKEMAP
 Pure fusion weapon

Notes

References

Further reading

Basic principles 

 
 
  2,600 pages.

History

Analyzing fallout

External links

Principles 
 "Basic Principles of Staged Radiation Implosion (Teller–Ulam)" from Carey Sublette's NuclearWeaponArchive.org.
 "Matter, Energy, and Radiation Hydrodynamics" from Carey Sublette's Nuclear Weapons FAQ.
 "Engineering and Design of Nuclear Weapons" from Carey Sublette's Nuclear Weapons FAQ.
 "Elements of Thermonuclear Weapon Design" from Carey Sublette's Nuclear Weapons FAQ.
 Annotated bibliography for nuclear weapons design from the Alsos Digital Library for Nuclear Issues

History 
 PBS: Race for the Superbomb: Interviews and Transcripts  (with U.S. and USSR bomb designers as well as historians).
 Howard Morland on how he discovered the "H-bomb secret" (includes many slides).
 The Progressive November 1979 issue – "The H-Bomb Secret: How we got it, why we're telling" (entire issue online).
 Annotated bibliography on the hydrogen bomb from the Alsos Digital Library
 University of Southampton, Mountbatten Centre for International Studies, Nuclear History Working Paper No5.
 Peter Kuran's "Trinity and Beyond"  – documentary film on the history of nuclear weapon testing.
 YouTube Playlist of declassified nuclear explosion tests obtained by converting film scans to digital at Lawrence Livermore Laboratory

Nuclear weapon design
Nuclear secrecy
ur:ہائیڈروجن بم